Deep Dish is an American electronic music duo, consisting of Ali "Dubfire" Shirazinia and Sharam Tayebi.

Biography
Based in Washington, D.C., it is well known for providing house or dance remixes of tracks of famous artists such as Madonna, Janet Jackson, Cher, Stevie Nicks and Gabrielle, and for its live DJ sets. Its collaborations and remixing abilities first came to attention with its seminal 1995 remix of De'Lacy's "Hideaway". Deep Dish's album Junk Science was released in 1998. The duo was nominated for a Grammy for their remix of Madonna's "Music", and won a Best Remixed Recording Grammy for its remix of Dido's "Thank You". In 2006, the DJs disbanded and moved to solo careers. They regrouped in 2014, and have released a new single "Quincy".

In August 2009, Sharam was featured on the Essential Mix and his mix was subsequently voted the best of 2009.

On March 22, 2014, Deep Dish reunited for their first Essential Mix since 2008.

Discography

Albums
1998 Junk Science
2005 George Is On

Singles/EPs
1994 "Chocolate City (Love Songs)"
1994 "High Frequency" (Pres. Quench)
1994 "The Dream" (Pres. Prana)
1995 "Sexy Dance" (Pres. Quench DC)
1995 "Come Back" (Pres. DC Deepressed)
1995 "Wear The Hat"
1996 "Stay Gold"
1997 "Stranded"
1998 "Stranded (In Dub)"
1998 "The Future of the Future (Stay Gold)" (with Everything but the Girl)
1999 "Mohammad Is Jesus…"
1999 "Summer's Over"
2003 "Global Underground: Toronto [12" Single]
2004 "Flashdance"
2005 "Say Hello"
2006 "Sacramento"
2006 "Dreams" (with Stevie Nicks)
2006 "Be the Change", a musical work dedicated to Anousheh Ansari's space flight as she became the world's first female private space traveler 
2014 "Quincy" (Virgin)

DJ mixes
1995 Penetrate Deeper1995 Undisputed1996 In House We Trust Vol. 11996 DJ's Take Control, Vol. 31997 Cream Separates1998 One Nation Under House Session 11998 One Nation Under House Session 21999 Yoshiesque2000 Renaissance Ibiza2001 Global Underground: Moscow2001 Yoshiesque, Vol. 22003 Global Underground: Toronto2006 Global Underground: Dubai (by Sharam)2007 Global Underground: Taipei (by Dubfire)Productions
1992 Hex - Tricky Jazz
1996 Alcatraz - Give Me Luv
2002 Timo Maas - Help Me
2003 Various Artists - Slip 'N' Slide Ibiza 2

Co-productions
1996 The Unknown Factor - The Basic Factor Album

Remixes

1993 Scottie Deep featuring Toni Williams - Soul Searchin'
1993 Naomi Daniel - Feel The Fire
1993 Angela Marni - Slippin' & Slidin'
1993 BT - Relativity
1994 Elastic Reality - Cassa De X
1994 Prana - The Dream
1994 Joi Cardwell - Trouble
1994 Gena Bess - How Hard I Search
1994 BT - The Moment Of Truth
1994 Scott Taylor - Don't Turn Your Back On Me
1995 Janet Jackson - When I Think Of You
1995 The Shamen - Transamazonia
1995 Quench - Sexy Dance
1995 Ashley Beedle - Revolutions In Dub
1995 De'Lacy - Hideaway
1995 Dajae - Day By Day
1995 Paula Abdul - Crazy Cool
1995 e-N - The Horn Ride
1995 Gusto - Disco's Revenge
1995 Swing 52 - Color Of My Skin
1996 Everything but the Girl - Wrong
1996 The Beloved - Three Steps To Heaven
1996 Global Communication - The Deep
1996 Aquarythm - Ether's Whisper
1996 Pet Shop Boys - Se A Vida É (That's The Way Life Is)
1996 Lisa Moorish - Mr. Friday Night
1996 Sandy B - Make The World Go Round
1996 All-Star Madness - Magic
1996 De'Lacy - That Look
1996 Victor Romeo - Love Will Find a Way
1996 Dangerous Minds - Live In Unity
1996 Dished-Out Bums - Lost In Space
1996 Kristine W - Land Of The Living
1996 Tina Turner - In Your Wildest Dreams
1996 Alcatraz - Giv Me Luv
1996 BT featuring Tori Amos - Blue Skies
1997 D-Note - Waiting Hopefully
1997 Adam F - Music In My Mind
1997 Sandy B - Ain't No Need To Hide
1997 Olive - Miracle
1997 Michael Jackson - Is It Scary

1998 Love and Rockets - Resurrection Hex
1998 Danny Tenaglia featuring Celeda - Music Is the Answer
1998 Eddie Amador - House Music
1998 DJ Rap - Good To Be Alive
1998 16B - Falling
1998 The Rolling Stones - Saint Of Me
1999 Brother Brown Featuring Frank'ee - Under The Water
1999 Eddie Amador - Rise
1999 Billie Ray Martin - Honey
1999 Slipknot - (Sic)
1999 J.D. Braithwaite - Give Me the Night
1999 Beth Orton - Central Reservation
2000 Amber - Sexual (Li Da De)
2000 Madonna - Music
2000 Gabrielle - Rise
2000 Morel - True (The Faggot Is You)
2000 Sven Vath - Barbarella
2000 Dusted - Always Remember To Respect and Honour Your Mother - Part One
2001 Dido - Thank You
2001 iiO - Rapture
2001 *NSYNC - Pop
2001 Planet Funk - Inside All the People
2001 Madonna - Impressive Instant
2001 Delerium - Innocente
2001 Depeche Mode - Freelove
2002 Justin Timberlake - Like I Love You
2002 Timo Maas featuring Kelis - Help Me
2002 Beenie Man featuring Janet - Feel It Boy
2002 Elisa - Come Speak To Me
2003 Dido - Stoned
2003 Madonna - Bedtime Story
2003 Whatever, Girl - Activator
2003 P. Diddy - Let's Get Ill
2004 Louie Vega & Jay 'Sinister' Sealée Feat. Julie McKnight - Diamond Life
2005 David Guetta - The World Is Mine
2005 Paul van Dyk - The Other Side
2006 Robbie Rivera - Float Away
2006 Coldplay - Clocks

Chart positions

Awards

Won
International Dance Music Award 2005 for Best House/Garage Track "Say Hello", Best Progressive/Trance Track "Say Hello" and Ortofon Best American DJ Award
International Dance Music Awards 2005 for Best Underground Dance Track for "Flashdance"
DanceStar USA Award 2004 for Best Compilation (US Releases) for Deep Dish - GU 025: Toronto and Best DJ
Ibiza DJ Award 2004 for Best Set of the Season
DanceStar USA Award 2002 Best Compilation for Deep Dish - GU 021: Moscow
Grammy Award 2002 "Best Remixed Recording" for Dido's "Thank You"
"Hot Duo", Rolling Stone, August 2001Muzik Magazine SAS Award 1998 "Best International DJ"

Nominations
WMC Best American DJ, 2008
DJ Awards for Best Tech-House / Progressive DJ, 2006
Grammy Award 2005 "Best Dance Recording" for Deep Dish's "Say Hello"
DanceStar USA Award 2004 for Best Remix (Worldwide DJ's) for P. Diddy's "Let's Get Ill" (Deep Dish Remix) (Bad Boy)
DJ Awards for Best House DJ, 2003
DanceStar USA Award 2003 Party 93.1 FM Award for Best Remix for Justin Timberlake's "Like I Love You" (Deep Dish remix) (Jive)
Grammy Award 2001 "Remixer of The Year" (NonClassical)

Other rankings
Number 1 in the "Best Progressive DJ" category of BPM magazine's 2006 "America's Favorite DJ's" poll
Number 2 in the "Best Dance/DJ Artist" category by the critics of Rolling Stone for its music awards of 2001
Number 10 in DJ Magazines World's Top 100 DJ's reader's poll for 2006, number 8 for 2005, number 10 for 2004, number 9 for 2003, number 16 in 2002, and number 10 in 2001
Number 5 out of 50 of America's Favorite DJ's in BPM'' in 2005, number 12 in 2004 and number 9 in 2003 and 2002

References

External links
 Official website
 [ AllMusic bio]
 

Electronic music groups from Washington, D.C.
American dance music groups
American house music duos
Electronic dance music duos
Remixers
Arista Records artists
Club DJs
Grammy Award winners
Progressive house musicians
Musicians of Iranian descent